Douglas Trevor (born 1969) is an American author and academic. He received the Iowa Short Fiction Award and was a finalist for the Hemingway Foundation/PEN Award for his first book, a collection of stories entitled The Thin Tear in the Fabric of Space (2005). His other books include The Poetics of Melancholy in Early Modern England (2004), the novel Girls I Know (2013), which won the 2013 Balcones Fiction Prize, and most recently the short story collection The Book of Wonders. He teaches in the English Department and Creative Writing Program at the University of Michigan, and is a former Director of the Helen Zell Writers' Program.

Biography
Trevor was born in Pasadena, California. He moved to Denver, Colorado at the age of three.

He attended high school at the Kent Denver School and from there went to Princeton University, where he studied Comparative Literature and Creative Writing. In the Princeton Creative Writing Program, Trevor worked with Joyce Carol Oates, Russell Banks, and Toni Morrison. After graduating Phi Beta Kappa, Magna Cum Laude in 1992, Trevor went to France on a Rotary Fellowship to study the essayist Michel de Montaigne at the Université de Tours. After completing a year of study, he matriculated to Harvard University, where he began work on an English PhD. In 1999 he completed his PhD and took an assistant professorship in the English Department at the University of Iowa. In 2001 he was married. He received tenure in 2005. While at Iowa, Trevor also served for a time as the fiction editor of The Iowa Review (2000–2004). In 2007 he took a tenured position at the University of Michigan. The father of two, he was divorced in 2010.

Sexual Misconduct Allegations and Retaliation Finding
On January 11, 2021, The Michigan Daily published an article detailing accusations of harassment, retaliation and intimidation against Trevor from three individuals with relationships to the University of Michigan English Department. The university's Office of Institutional Equity investigated the claims and did not find Trevor's conduct to be “sufficiently severe, persistent or pervasive to create a sexually hostile environment,” but LSA Dean Anne Curzan issued sanctions against Trevor in a two-page official letter to Trevor. Curzan wrote that Trevor had “created an intimidating, hostile, and offensive climate” in the Helen Zell Writers’ Program after retaliating against a fellow employee. Trevor will not be eligible for a merit increase in base salary in the next college-wide faculty salary program, is barred from holding leadership positions within the department for two academic years, and cannot conduct office hours with the door closed or meet individually with students off-campus for two academic years. Trevor denies engaging in any sexual misconduct.

Published Work
Trevor's first published work in a national distributed journal was in The Ontario Review when he was twenty-four. For the next decade, he published short stories in journals and magazines such as Glimmer Train, The Paris Review, Epoch (American magazine), The New England Review, and The Black Warrior Review.

In 2004, Trevor's first book appeared. The Poetics of Melancholy in Early Modern England was a study of how writers such as John Donne, Edmund Spenser, and John Milton utilized the term melancholic to enhance their reputations as learned writers. In 2005, Trevor published his first collection of stories, The Thin Tear in the Fabric of Space. Each of these nine stories circles around a different experience of grief following the death of a loved one. The collection is dedicated to the writer's sister, Jolee, who died unexpectedly in 1998.

As a scholar of sixteenth- and seventeenth-century English literature, Trevor has published widely on writers ranging from Thomas More to Milton, and was the co-editor (with Carla Mazzio) of Historicism, Psychoanalysis, and Early Modern Culture (2000).

Following the publication of Girls I Know, Trevor returned to short fiction, publishing several stories in journals such as Ploughshares Solos and The Iowa Review. In 2017, Trevor's second collection of stories, The Book of Wonders, appeared. The nine stories that comprise this collection circle around characters in the midst of trying to reinvent themselves. Each of these characters is connected in one way or another to books, or to storytelling more generally.

Bibliography
Books
The Book of Wonders. SixOneSeven Books 2017. 
Girls I Know. SixOneSeven Books 2013. 
The Thin Tear in the Fabric of Space. University of Iowa Press, 2005. 
The Poetics of Melancholy in Early Modern England. 2004. 
Historicism, Psychoanalysis, and Early Modern Culture. 2000. 

Short Stories and Novellas
"The Detroit Frankfurt School Discussion Group" (2016, Ploughshares Solos)
"Endymion" (2015, The Iowa Review)
"Faucets" (2015, Midwestern Gothic)
"The Program in Profound Thought" (2014, Notre Dame Review)
"The Novelist and the Short Story Writer" (2014, The Minnesota Review)
"Sonnet 126" (2013, Michigan Quarterly Review)
"Slugger and the Fat Man" (2013, New Letters)
"The Librarian" (2010, Michigan Quarterly Review)
"The Thin Tear in the Fabric of Space" (2005, The Black Warrior Review)
"The Surprising Weight of the Body's Organs" (2005, Epoch)
"Girls I Know" (2004, Epoch)
"The Fellowship of the Bereaved" (2003, Fugue)
"Little Indian" (2003, Notre Dame Review)
"The River" (2003, Glimmer Train)
"Central Square" (2002, New England Review)
"Saint Francis in Flint" (2001, The Paris Review)
"The Whores in Tours" (1996, Madison Review)
"A Pale Morning Done" (1995, River City: A Journal of Contemporary Culture)
"Brother Love" (1994, Ontario Review)
"The Box Chart" (1991, Nassau Literary Review)

Awards and honors
The Balcones Fiction Prize (for Girls I Know, 2013)
New Letters Readers Award (for "Slugger and the Fat Man," 2013)
Distinguished Visiting Author, University Liggett School (2013)
Distinguished Alumni Award, Kent Denver School (2013)
Fellow, Institute for the Humanities, University of Michigan (2012–2013)
LSA Excellence in Education Award, University of Michigan (2011) 
Theodore Morrison Fellow in Fiction, Bread Loaf Writers' Conference (2007)
Writer-in-Residence, the Ucross Foundation, Clearmont, Wyoming (2007, 2012)
Finalist, Hemingway Foundation/PEN Award for First Fiction for The Thin Tear in the Fabric of Space (2006)
Anthologized, "Girls I Know," in The O. Henry Prize Stories 2006 
Anthologized, "Girls I Know," in The Best American Nonrequired Reading 2005 
John C. Gerber Teaching Prize, Department of English, University of Iowa (2005) 
Dean's Scholar, University of Iowa (2005–2006) 
Winner, The Iowa Short Fiction Award for The Thin Tear in the Fabric of Space (2005) 
David R. Sokolov Scholar in Fiction, Bread Loaf Writers' Conference (2003))
Fellow, The Obermann Center for Advanced Studies, University of Iowa (2002)
Winner, Chris O'Malley Prize in Short Fiction, Madison Review (1996)
Finalist, The Nelson Algren Awards in Short Fiction, Chicago Tribune (1993)
Finalist, Rhodes Scholarship (1992)
Francis LeMoyne Page Senior Thesis Award, Princeton University; Phi Beta Kappa, Magna Cum Laude (1992)

References

External links
Official website
Department of English: People: Profile View
U-M Helen Zell Writers' Program: Faculty profile

1969 births
Living people
21st-century American novelists
Writers from Pasadena, California
Harvard University alumni
American male novelists
American male essayists
American male short story writers
University of Michigan faculty
21st-century American short story writers
21st-century American essayists
21st-century American male writers
Princeton University alumni
Novelists from Michigan